Deadman Hill is a summit in Wayne County, Utah, in the United States.

Deadman Hill marks the spot where a young fugitive was buried after being shot by vigilantes.

References

Mountains of Wayne County, Utah
Mountains of Utah